Edward Charles Cocks (27 July 1786 – 8 October 1812) was a British Army officer and politician.

The eldest son of John Cocks, 1st Earl Somers, he was Member of Parliament for Reigate from 1806 to 1812.

From December 1808 until 1812 he served in the Peninsular War, where alongside his regular duties, he worked as an 'observing officer'. These were officers who were tasked with probing deep behind the enemy lines to collect information on the enemy. He died, with the rank of Major, leading his men in an attempt to storm a breach at the Siege of Burgos.

He was a great favourite of his commander Arthur Wellesley, the future Duke of Wellington, who admired him for his bravery and sharp perception and who took news of his death badly. Wellesley entered (then Colonel) Frederick Ponsonby's room and paced up and down in total silence, much to his junior officers consternation, before stating quietly: "Cocks is dead".

References

G. E. C., ed. Geoffrey F. White. The Complete Peerage. (London: St. Chaterine Press, 1953) Vol. XII, Part 1, p. 32-33.

External links 
 

1786 births
1812 deaths
UK MPs 1806–1807
UK MPs 1807–1812
Members of the Parliament of the United Kingdom for English constituencies
16th The Queen's Lancers officers
British Army personnel of the Napoleonic Wars
British military personnel killed in action in the Napoleonic Wars
48th Regiment of Foot officers
Heirs apparent who never acceded